was a Japanese volleyball player.

He was the member of the Japanese Men's National Volleyball team as a setter. He is the man who invented the ceiling serve, a serve where the ball is hit up towards the ceiling with all the lights to make it difficult to judge the landing. He retired in 1980, and died of stomach cancer in 1983.

See also
JT Thunders
Nekoda Memorial (Japan high school volleyball tournament in Chūgoku region among the 1st year students)
Nekoda Memorial Gymnasium

External links
Katsutoshi Nekoda

1944 births
1983 deaths
Olympic volleyball players of Japan
Olympic gold medalists for Japan
Olympic silver medalists for Japan
Olympic bronze medalists for Japan
Volleyball players at the 1964 Summer Olympics
Volleyball players at the 1968 Summer Olympics
Volleyball players at the 1972 Summer Olympics
Volleyball players at the 1976 Summer Olympics
Japanese men's volleyball players
Sportspeople from Hiroshima
Deaths from stomach cancer
Olympic medalists in volleyball
Asian Games medalists in volleyball
Volleyball players at the 1966 Asian Games
Volleyball players at the 1970 Asian Games
Volleyball players at the 1974 Asian Games
Volleyball players at the 1978 Asian Games
Medalists at the 1966 Asian Games
Medalists at the 1970 Asian Games
Medalists at the 1974 Asian Games
Medalists at the 1978 Asian Games
Asian Games gold medalists for Japan
Asian Games silver medalists for Japan
Medalists at the 1972 Summer Olympics
Medalists at the 1968 Summer Olympics
Medalists at the 1964 Summer Olympics
20th-century Japanese people